Listamlet is a townland in County Tyrone, Northern Ireland. It is situated in the barony of Dungannon Middle and the civil parish of Clonfeacle and covers an area of 166 acres. 

The name derives from the Irish: Lios Tamhlachta (Fort of the Burial Place).

In 1841 the population of the townland was 257 people (48 houses) and in 1851 it was 196 people (37 houses).

See also
List of townlands of County Tyrone

External links
Tyrone Courier: Sack of Listamlet on 14 August 1880
Irish Times report (PDF) on Sack of Listamlet (14 August 1880) and The Lady Day  Riot in Dungannon (16 August 1880)
Townlands of county Tyrone, Public Record Office

References

Civil parish of Clonfeacle
Townlands of County Tyrone